Adam Taylor (born 23 June 1991) is an Australian tennis player.

Taylor has a career high ATP doubles ranking of 335 achieved on 17 December 2018.

Taylor made his ATP main draw debut at the 2022 Adelaide International 1 after receiving a wildcard into the doubles main draw with his brother Jason Taylor.

References

External links

1991 births
Living people
Australian male tennis players
Tennis people from New South Wales